Donald A. Gorske (born November 28, 1953) is an American world record holder known as the "ultimate Big Mac fan," having eaten over 32,672 such hamburgers from the U.S. fast food chain McDonald's in his lifetime, earning him a place in the Guinness Book of Records. A resident of Fond du Lac, Wisconsin, Gorske claims the Big Mac constitutes 90-95% of his total solid food intake. He is featured in the documentaries Super Size Me (2004) and Don Gorske: Mac Daddy (2005), and is the author of 22,477 Big Macs (2008).
Gorske's claims are mainly self-subtantiated and due to lack of official confirmation, are unable to be accurately verified.

Diet
Gorske claims that after getting his first car, the first place he went to was the McDonald's on Military Road in his hometown of Fond du Lac on May 17, 1972. He purchased and ate three Big Macs at lunch time. He then returned two more times that day to consume a total of nine Big Macs the same day he discovered the burger. He further claims to have eaten 265 Big Macs in the following month, an average of 8.5 Big Macs per day. He also claims to drink almost nothing but Coca-Cola and, according to Super Size Me, he rarely eats the fries. At first, Don kept all the boxes of Big Macs he ate in the back of his car. He met and proposed to his wife, Mary, at a McDonald's in 1975. In addition, he has a statue of Ronald McDonald in his yard. Gorske had a single Burger King Whopper sandwich in 1984 and never ate one again. Gorske tried the Whopper after his friend bet him $5 to do so, later spending the winnings on Big Macs.

In 2003, Gorske ate 741 Big Macs, an average of 2.03 Big Macs per day. Daily consumption of two Big Macs amounts to 1,080 calories, according to McDonald's published nutritional information, compared to the USDA recommendation of 2,200 calories per day. Gorske consumes mainly calorie-rich food, but he maintains a stable weight by consuming fewer calories daily than the average American. He says his taste buds have always fluctuated in sensitivity, so he often eats a Big Mac without being able to taste it.

Gorske commented in 2008 that his obsessive–compulsive disorder is what fuels his love of Big Macs, noting he also records when and where he eats his Big Macs in a notebook he always carries, and that he has kept every burger receipt in a box.

On May 17, 2011, Gorske ate his 25,000th Big Mac at his favorite McDonald's restaurant in Fond du Lac. On his birthdays, he puts candles in a Big Mac like a cake, and when Christmas time comes around, he treats himself to more Big Macs while his family has more traditional Christmas food. He claims that since he ate his first Big Mac, there have only been eight separate days on which he did not eat a single Big Mac. One of these days was the day his mother died, and he did not eat a Big Mac to respect her request. Other days included a "snow day" when McDonald's was unable to open due to snow, a Thanksgiving, days he was traveling and could not find a McDonald's, and various days Gorske had to stay at work past midnight. Gorske has since started keeping an "emergency stash" of Big Macs in his freezer for emergencies and snow days. 

Gorske ate his 30,000th Big Mac on May 4, 2018. On May 17, 2022, Gorske celebrated 50 years of eating Big Macs nearly every day since May 1972.

Job and health
Gorske worked as a correctional officer at Waupun Correctional Institution for 25 years, retiring in May 2011. Just prior to retirement, at his first doctor visit since 1985, his cholesterol level was 156 mg/dl, below the average of 208 mg/dl. He claims no known health issues and has not had other reason to visit a doctor.

Appearances
He appeared in the documentary Super Size Me. In the DVD extras for the film, it is revealed he works as a correctional officer. He also makes a cameo appearance in cartoon form in the film.

In 2006, Gorske appeared as a contestant on the game show I've Got a Secret.  Celebrity panelist Billy Bean was able to guess the Big Mac as Gorske's food of choice.

On May 25, 2009, Gorske was featured on The Rachael Ray Show.

To congratulate Gorske on eating his 25,000th Big Mac, he appeared on The Kyle & Jackie O Show on May 20, 2011, and Lopez Tonight on May 23, 2011.

The Netflix series History 101 featured Gorske to start its 2020 episode examining fast food.

See also

List of sandwiches

References

External links
 Man gets Big Mac attack — 23,000 times September, 2008
 Big Mac eater downs 19,000th burger March, 2003
 Man Eats His 18,000th Big Mac: Keeps Extra Supply In Freezer November, 2001
 Spotlight on Gorske July 18, 2004
 Wisconsin man eats 23,000 Big Macs September 9, 2008
 Amazon: 22,477 Big Macs August, 2009
 

1953 births
Living people
People from Fond du Lac, Wisconsin
McDonald's people
American people of Eastern European descent
People with obsessive–compulsive disorder